The following are the standings of the 2004–05 Azadegan League football season.

Group 1

Group 2

Second round

Relegation Round

Azadegan League seasons
Iran
2004–05 in Iranian football leagues